SSCS may refer to:

South Seneca Central School
Sea Shepherd Conservation Society
Sutherland Shire Christian School
South Suburban Co-operative Society, a retail co-operative in south London, Surrey and Kent
State of Slovenes, Croats and Serbs
Surface-Ship Command System, a naval combat system developed by CAP Scientific
Service Station Computer Systems, office management software
Solid-State Circuits Society, a society of the Institute of Electrical and Electronics Engineers
"Sandy Springs Cadet Squadron", a unit in the Georgia Wing of the Civil Air Patrol.